Allan Arthur Hunter (6 March 1926 – 31 August 1982) was a New Zealand cricketer who played first-class cricket for Central Districts from 1951 to 1956, and Hawke Cup cricket for Nelson from 1950 to 1955.

Hunter was educated at Nelson College in 1940 and 1941. An opening batsman, he scored his only first-class century in his second match: 108 against Otago in 1951–52. He also scored 105 for Central Districts in their two-day match against the touring South Africans in March 1953; he played, unsuccessfully, a week later in the trial match to help the New Zealand selectors choose the team for the tour of South Africa in 1953-54.

He opened the batting for Nelson in the Hawke Cup when they held the title in the early 1950s. He scored 198 in eight hours in the innings victory over Taranaki in December 1952. He was later Nelson's coach and sole selector.

References

External links

1926 births
1982 deaths
New Zealand cricketers
Central Districts cricketers
Cricketers from Nelson, New Zealand
People educated at Nelson College